Andrew Sullivan was a member of the Wisconsin State Assembly during the 1st Wisconsin Legislature (1848). Sullivan represented the 5th District of Milwaukee County, Wisconsin. He was a Democrat.

References

People from Milwaukee County, Wisconsin
Democratic Party members of the Wisconsin State Assembly
Year of birth missing
Year of death missing